Adelaide Festival Centre, Australia's first capital city multi-purpose arts centre and the home of South Australia's performing arts, was built in the 1970s, designed by Hassell Architects. Located on Kaurna Yarta, the Festival Theatre opened in June 1973 with the rest of the centre following soon after. The complex includes Festival Theatre, Dunstan Playhouse (formerly The Playhouse and Optima Playhouse), Space Theatre (formerly The Space) and several gallery and function spaces.

Adelaide Festival Centre hosts Adelaide Festival and presents major festivals across the year including Adelaide Cabaret Festival, OzAsia Festival, DreamBIG Children's Festival, Adelaide Guitar Festival and OUR MOB. It is also home to Adelaide Symphony Orchestra, State Opera South Australia, Australian Dance Theatre, State Theatre Company South Australia, The Australian Ballet, Brink and Windmill Theatre Co.

The Festival Centre is managed by a statutory corporation, the Adelaide Festival Centre Trust, which is responsible for encouraging and facilitating artistic, cultural and performing arts activities, as well as maintaining and improving the building and facilities of the Adelaide Festival Centre complex and Her Majesty's Theatre.

The Festival Centre was erected on the site of the Adelaide City Baths, which had been there for over a century.

 the site (external to the venues) is undergoing major redevelopment, started in 2016, but the theatre spaces have remained open. The car park has been completed. The redevelopment was completed in February 2022.

History and construction

Background
In the 1960s, the Adelaide Festival of the Arts started to outgrow the city's existing venues, and there was a push to build a "Festival Hall". The Adelaide Festival Theatre Act 1964 provided for the erection of the Festival Theatre building. The originally proposed site was the Carclew building in North Adelaide, which had been purchased from the Bonython family by the Adelaide City Council for the purposes of building a Festival Hall.

Hall accepted the money. While on a trip to London, Steele Hall visited the Royal Festival Hall on the banks of the River Thames and decided that the banks of the River Torrens was the ideal choice for the site of the Adelaide Festival of the Arts and the cultural heart of the city. During this time, the state government changed hands, but the drive for a new centre continued with fervour. When Don Dunstan became Premier he expanded the idea into a "Festival Centre", incorporating multiple smaller venues.

The Lord Mayor of Adelaide, Robert Porter, supported by Dunstan, launched a public appeal to raise funds to build the Festival Centre and establish Adelaide as a significant city in the art world. The appeal raised its target within a week, and was soon over-subscribed; the surplus was set aside to create a collection of artworks to grace the new building.

The building was designed by Hassell, McConnell and Partners for the Adelaide City Council and the Adelaide Festival Centre Trust, and has been "hailed as a major step forward in modern architecture in South Australia". It was designed "from the inside out" and is particularly associated with the architect John Morphett  and Colin Hassell. Prior to designing the buildings, Hassell led a team which included Morphett to the United States and Europe to undertake a study of theatre designs.

The Adelaide City Baths, which had stood on the site since their creation in 1861 and upgraded several times since, including the addition of an Olympic-sized swimming pool in 1940, were demolished in 1969 to make way for the new centre.

Construction
Adelaide Festival Centre, Australia's first multi-purpose arts centre, was built in three parts, from April 1970 to 1980.

On 2 June 1973 the Festival Theatre was officially opened by Prime Minister Gough Whitlam at a gala performance of Act Two, Scene 1 of Beethoven's opera Fidelio and Choral Symphony. The construction of the Playhouse (now Dunstan Playhouse), Space Theatre and Amphitheatre followed.

(By comparison, the Sydney Opera House, completed in 1973, cost .)

Outdoor areas
Outdoor sculptures graced the outdoor spaces, including the prominent stainless steel Tetrahedra, also known as Environmental Sculpture and Tetrahedrons, by Bert Flugelman (whose Mall's Balls is perhaps his better known work).

South of complex, the Festival Plaza, initially known as the Southern Plaza was completed in March 1977, comprising an environmental sculpture by highly regarded West German artist Otto Hajek, which he called Adelaide Urban Iconography. (In the Festival Centre archives it is variously named Shorthand Adelaide, City Iconograph, and City Iconography, and government records give the title City Sign Sculpture Garden. It has also been referred to as "Hajek's Plaza", and was believed to be the largest artwork in Australia.

Given the brief of camouflaging the new air-conditioning vent from the carpark below that would rise  from the concrete surface of the plaza, Hajek, arguing that the "real job" of sculpture was social, created a plan that integrated sculpture with architecture, creating a social space encompassing the whole Southern Plaza. His plan consisted of "colourful, geometric painted surfaces and cement forms", and it was intended to include a fountain and other water features, extensive planting of vegetation, lighting and provision for sound, which would encourage people to interact with the "concrete garden". After its opening on 22 March 1977, the plaza stirred debate and opinions were mixed, but its designs were seen to "consciously exemplify the new practices and relations embodied in the concept of environmental art". Labelled as empty and ugly by some, it was nonetheless an artwork of its times. In 1977 it was awarded a "brickbat" by the Civic Trust, but Australia Post honoured the sculpture in 1986 by issuing a commemorative stamp for South Australia’s sesquicentenary. Hajek's wife, artist and poet Katja Hajek, wrote in 2001 that the plaza "is well-known in the world of art and became acknowledged as an artistically outstanding creation of the last quarter of the 20th century".

In the decades following, its painted surfaces, fountains and vegetation were not well-maintained, there were some problems with its concrete decking, it was not used for events, and, crucially, it did not attract incidental foot traffic to interact with its forms. In 1987, the fountain, unused for the prior three years owing to a leak,  was demolished as part of a  upgrade of the plaza.

21st century redevelopment
In 2002–3, the area around Adelaide Festival Centre was redeveloped substantially. The Festival Plaza was redesigned, including opening the underground roadway to the sky. Although a pedestrian suspension bridge was built on its west side, the Plaza was essentially isolated as a result of this redevelopment.

In 2013, the Government of South Australia announced that the Plaza would be redeveloped, with Hajek's work decommissioned and replaced. The removal of such a significant public work of art was seen as vandalism by some commentators, including Hajek's wife. However, not everyone in the world of art and architecture or the general public mourned its passing.

From 2016 the Festival Plaza has been undergoing a  redevelopment, as part of the major redevelopment of the Riverbank Precinct. The new public plaza, known as the Public Realm, was expected to be completed by 2020, while the office buildings and retail spaces are scheduled to be finished by 2022. The architects of the original complex, Hassell, remain as architectural consultants for the project, in collaboration with ARM Architecture and landscape architects Taylor Cullity Lethlean for the outdoor spaces. 

Changes to the design of the Public Realm submitted for approval in April 2020 were expected to push back the completion date to 2023, and  there is limited access to the venues and no access to the plaza area.

2018 tram extension
A short branch from the Glenelg tram line to the Festival Centre was opened in October 2018.

Governance
In 1971 the Adelaide Festival Centre Trust was established as a statutory authority by the Adelaide Festival Centre Trust Act 1971, reporting to the Minister for the Arts.

From about 1996 until late 2018, Arts SA (later Arts South Australia) had responsibility for this and several other statutory bodies such as the South Australian Museum and the Art Gallery of South Australia. Arts SA leased Her Majesty's Theatre and the Festival Centre to the Trust, which was responsible for "encouraging and facilitating artistic, cultural and performing arts activities throughout the State" and managing and maintaining the theatres.

It also borrowed  from the South Australian Government Financing Authority for a maximum term of 10 years to fund Her Majesty’s Theatre redevelopment.

From late 2018, the functions previously held by Arts SA were transferred to direct oversight by the Department of the Premier and Cabinet, Arts and Culture section.

Venues
Adelaide Festival Centre houses several theatres and galleries, as well as function spaces and the administrative hub of the Festival Centre.
 Festival Theatre is the largest proscenium arch theatre in Adelaide, seating close to 2000 people. It was designed as both a lyric theatre and concert hall, and is used not only for theatrical productions and large concerts, but also for graduation ceremonies, seminars and many other community functions. Its huge backstage area makes the stage area one of the largest in the southern hemisphere. It also houses the Silver Jubilee Organ, a "hovering" pipe organ built and donated to mark the Silver Jubilee of Queen Elizabeth II.
 Dunstan Playhouse, initially known as The Playhouse, and in 1999–2000 the Optima Playhouse, and then renamed after Don Dunstan. It is located in the Drama Centre behind the main building, is a more intimate venue, seating 620 people on two levels. The State Theatre Company  has been based here since 1974, and uses the theatre, the rehearsal rooms and the extensive production workshop also housed in this second building.
 Space Theatre is a versatile studio theatre, sharing the Drama Centre building with the Dunstan. It has no traditional stage or fixed seating, meaning its configuration is completely flexible. It can be turned into a theatre in the round, a corner stage setting, or a cabaret venue. The Space seats anywhere from 200 to 350 people, depending on the configuration.
 Her Majesty's Theatre is 1500-seat theatre located on Grote Street. First opened in 1913, the theatre underwent extensive rebuilding from 2018 to 2020 to become a world-class venue.
 Artspace Gallery is a gallery exhibition space situated in the second building above the Dunstan Playhouse. 
 The Terrace, formerly called the Amphitheatre, is an outdoor space overlooking Elder Park and the River Torrens.
Artspace Gallery and QBE Galleries are further exhibition spaces.

Associated companies and events
Adelaide Festival Centre is home to South Australia's leading professional performance companies, including Adelaide Symphony Orchestra, State Opera South Australia, Australian Dance Theatre, State Theatre Company of South Australia, Brink Productions and Windmill Theatre Co.

It is the host of Adelaide Festival and presents major festivals across the year including: Adelaide Cabaret Festival, Adelaide Guitar Festival, OzAsia Festival, DreamBIG Children's Festival and OUR MOB.

References

Further reading
 Features Adelaide Festival Centre and Adelaide Convention Centre, with information about the design and construction of both.

External links
 

Performing arts in Adelaide
Theatres in Adelaide
Tourist attractions in Adelaide
Concert halls in Australia
Culture of South Australia
Event venues established in 1973
Performing arts centres in Australia
Entertainment venues in South Australia
Adelaide Park Lands
Modernist architecture in Australia